Nastella is a genus of beetles in the family Buprestidae, containing the following species:

 Nastella chalcodes (Wiedemann, 1821)
 Nastella flammea Bellamy, 1989
 Nastella hessei (Obenberger, 1931)
 Nastella uniformis Obenberger, 1931
 Nastella virgo Obenberger, 1931

References

Buprestidae genera